Siamanna is a comune (municipality) in the Province of Oristano in the Italian region Sardinia, located about  northwest of Cagliari and about  east of Oristano.

Siamanna borders the following municipalities: Allai, Oristano, Ruinas, Siapiccia, Simaxis, Villaurbana.

References

Cities and towns in Sardinia
1975 establishments in Italy
States and territories established in 1975